Acacia gracillima is a shrub or tree belonging to the genus Acacia and the subgenus Juliflorae that is native to north western Australia.

Description
It has  angular branchlets with slightly hairy ridges. Like most species of Acacia it has phyllodes rather than true leaves. The evergreen phyllodes have a linear shape that tapers slightly towards the base and can be slightly curved. They have one prominent nerve found near the dorsal margin and another two less prominent longitudinal nerves. It blooms between May and July producing golden flowers. The greenish-brown seed pods that form after flowering have a linear shape and are constricted between each seed. The black-brown seeds have an oblong-elliptic shape with a small dark areole that is surrounded by a closed pleurogram and a pale halo.

Distribution
It is endemic to the Kimberley region in northern Western Australia mostly on and around the Wunaamin-Miliwundi Ranges where it is often situated on rocky steep slopes and on savannah grasslands growing in rocky quartzite based soils.

See also
List of Acacia species

References

gracillima
Acacias of Western Australia
Plants described in 1975
Taxa named by Mary Tindale